Emma Kearney may refer to:

 Emma Kearney (actress) (born 1981), Irish actress
 Emma Kearney (sportswoman) (born 1989), Australian cricketer and footballer